Deuben is a village and a former municipality in the district Burgenlandkreis, in Saxony-Anhalt, Germany. Since 1 January 2011, it has been part of the town of Teuchern.

References

Former municipalities in Saxony-Anhalt
Teuchern